Several schools are called Spring Creek School.

In New Zealand:
Spring Creek School, New Zealand, in the Marlborough Region

In the United States:
Spring Creek School, Kansas, a former school - see National Register of Historic Places listings in Sumner County, Kansas
Spring Creek School, South Dakota - see National Register of Historic Places listings in Perkins County, South Dakota

See also
Spring Creek High School (Nevada)
Spring Creek High School (North Carolina), Seven Springs, North Carolina